The term Talibanization (or Talibanisation) refers to a type of Islamist practice that emerged following the rise of the Taliban movement in Afghanistan, where other religious groups or movements come to follow or imitate the strict practices of the Taliban.

Practices
In its original usage, Talibanization referred to groups who followed Taliban's practices such as:
usually strict regulation and segregation of women, including forbidding of most employment or schooling for women and girls;
the restriction or banning of Western culture and other activities generally tolerated by other Muslims such as music, sports, general entertainment (films, television, arts, etc.), and the Internet;
the banning of activities (especially hairstyles and clothing) generally tolerated by other Muslims on the grounds that the activities are "Western", non-Islamic or immoral;
oppression of Shia Muslims, including forced conversion into Sunni Islam under threat of persecution or killing (takfir);
aggressive prohibition and suppression of public displays of affection (PDA), adultery, extramarital sex, LGBT and pornography, particularly with the use of armed "religious police" and death penalty by rajm or beheading;
the destruction of non-Muslim artifacts, especially carvings and statues such as Bamyan Buddhas, generally tolerated by other Muslims, on the grounds that these artifacts are idolatrous or Shirk;
harboring of Al Qaeda or other extremists;
a discriminatory attitude towards non-Muslims such as sumptuary laws against Afghan Hindus, requiring them to wear yellow badges, a practice reminiscent of Nazi Germany's policies.
Violent suppression and persecution of modernist, moderate and liberal Muslims, often labeling them as bid'ah (innovation).
A negative view towards Jews and vigorous opposition to the state of Israel and the entire Western world, under the belief that Israel, the Jews and the West are considered enemies of Islam. This view is also common among other Islamist and Islamic extremist movements outside of Taliban.

Etymology
The term pre-dates the Islamic terrorist attacks of 9/11.  It was first used to describe areas or groups outside of Afghanistan which came under the influence of the Taliban, such as the areas of Waziristan in Pakistan, or situations analogous to the Taliban-Al-Qaeda relationship, such as the Islamic Courts Union (ICU) in Somalia and its harboring of Al Qaeda members, or similar harboring of Islamic extremists in Nigeria, Malaysia, or Kashmir and elsewhere around the world. It has been used to describe the influence of Islamist fundamentalist parties in Bangladesh.

The term was used in a Boston Globe editorial published on November 6, 1999, warning of the emerging threat of the Taliban regime almost two years before the attacks of September 11, 2001.

In the Gaza Strip

The influence of Islamic groups in the Gaza Strip has grown since the 1980s, especially as poverty has risen and fighting with Israel began in 2000. The efforts to impose Islamic law and traditions continued when Hamas forcefully seized control of the area in June 2007 and displaced security forces loyal to the secular President Mahmoud Abbas. After the civil war ended, Hamas declared the "end of secularism and heresy in the Gaza Strip." For the first time since the Sudanese coup of 1989 that brought Omar al-Bashir to power, a Muslim Brotherhood group ruled a significant geographic territory. Gaza human rights groups accuse Hamas of restricting many freedoms in the course of these attempts.

Following the takeover of the Gaza Strip in June 2007, Hamas has attempted to implement Islamic law in the Gaza Strip, mainly at schools, institutions and courts by imposing the Islamic dress or hijab on women. While Ismael Haniyeh officially denied that Hamas intended to establish an Islamic state, in the fourteen years since the 2007 coup, the Gaza Strip has exhibited the characteristics of Talibanization, whereby the Islamist organization imposed strict rules on women, discouraged activities commonly associated with Western or Christian culture, oppressed non-Muslim minorities, imposed sharia law, and deployed religious police to enforce these laws.

Arab-Israeli journalist Khaled Abu Toameh wrote in 2009 that "Hamas is gradually turning the Gaza Strip into a Taliban-style Islamic entity." According to Mkhaimar Abusada, a political science professor at Gaza's al-Azhar University, "Ruling by itself, Hamas can stamp its ideas on everyone (...) Islamizing society has always been part of Hamas strategy."

Palestinian researcher Dr. Khaled Al-Hroub has criticized what he called the "Taliban-like steps" Hamas has taken. In an article titled "The Hamas Enterprise and the Talibanization of Gaza", he wrote, "The Islamization that has been forced upon the Gaza Strip – the suppression of social, cultural, and press freedoms that do not suit Hamas's view[s] – is an egregious deed that must be opposed. It is the reenactment, under a religious guise, of the experience of [other] totalitarian regimes and dictatorships.

A 2005 research by Eli Berman of UC San Diego and the  National Bureau of Economic Research drew a number of parallels between Hamas and Taliban. Researchers noted that Taliban and Hamas are both highly ritualistic, extremely conservative Muslim groups, which augment the prohibitions of mainstream Islamic practice, and tend to segregate themselves from other Muslims and to be intolerant of deviation.

Reference to non-Muslims
The term is also used non-literally, and is applied to non-Islamic bodies and organizations by those who allege them to hold "repressive policies" based on their respective religions.

In addition, some members of the left in the United States may use it as a criticism of the Republican Party and the Christian Right in their allegations of the radical right wing implementing policies based on Fundamentalist Christianity.

Sometimes, different analogous neologisms are used by the accusers, such as allegations of "saffronization" used to describe or critique right-wing policies related to Hindu nationalism or as a slur used by far left and anti-Hindu groups. Radicalized Muslims often exploit the resonance with this term to attack Hindu nationalists as kafirs (infidels) and "Hindu Talibs". The term has also been used to denote Sikh Extremism (Khalistan)The Hindu : Opinion / Leader Page Articles : Talibanisation of Sikhism
In India, the far-left Naxalite terrorists beheaded Police inspector Francis Induwar in the state of Jharkhand in 2009. The action has been compared to the tactics of the Taliban, and fears exist that the leftists in these areas are "Talibanizing"India News | Today's latest updates and breaking news from India, Live India News

Like any highly politicized term, it may also be used hyperbolically or in an alarmist manner, to make a slippery slope argument, such as in the invocation of the phrase "Talibanization of Bradford" to discuss a gamut of common racial problems and tensions which fall far short of the imposition of sharia law and terrorist attacks. It may also be applied unfairly by those who do not understand Islamic culture and the basis of sharia law, or who fail to distinguish between moderate Islamic and extremist Islamist states, or misapplied to perceived threats which are not true or have yet to be proven.

See also
 Pashtunization
 Islamic fundamentalism
 Islamism
 Al-Qaedaism
 Islamofascism
 Year Zero (political notion)

References

Further reading
 

Islamism
Islam-related controversies
Islamic extremism
Neologisms
Taliban
Persecution by Muslims
Political terminology in Pakistan